Hakeem Lewis (born June 23, 1994), known professionally as Hak, is an American rapper, singer, record producer, songwriter and music video director from New York City. He is best known for once being a member of the hip hop group Ratking. Lewis later left Ratking in 2016 and released his first solo album, June, the same year.

Career 
Hak began his musical career in 2011 as a member of the New York City hip hop group Ratking with the rapper Wiki and the rapper-producer Sporting Life. With Ratking, Hak released one studio album, So It Goes (2014), and two extended plays, Wiki93 (2012) and 700-Fill (2015), before announcing his departure from the group on June 21, 2016. He said that the reason for his departure was feeling like he was being left out of the group and wanting to branch out into new possibilities with his music and art. His first studio album, June, was released on June 23, 2016.

Hak has collaborated with several other artists including Skrillex, Clams Casino, Kelela and Remy Banks.

Discography

Studio albums

Singles

As lead artist

As featured artist

Guest appearances

References 

1994 births
Living people